New Moon is a 1940 American musical film released by Metro-Goldwyn-Mayer and directed by Robert Z. Leonard, with uncredited direction by W. S. Van Dyke.

It is the second film adaptation of the operetta The New Moon, which premiered on Broadway in 1928. The stage version featured music by Sigmund Romberg and book and lyrics by Oscar Hammerstein II and others. The first film adaptation, also titled New Moon, which premiered in 1930, was less faithful to the stage version.

Plot

During the 18th century in New Orleans, Louisiana, a French nobleman in disguise as a bondsman, Charles (Nelson Eddy) leads his fellow bondsman in revolt against his ship's captain, commandeering the ship and heading out to sea.

Cast
 Jeanette MacDonald as Marianne de Beaumanoir
 Nelson Eddy as Charles (Henri), Duc de Villiers
 Mary Boland as Valerie de Rossac
 George Zucco as Vicomte Ribaud
 H. B. Warner as Father Michel
 Grant Mitchell as Governor of New Orleans
 Stanley Fields as Tambour
 Dick Purcell as Alexander
 John Miljan as Pierre Brugnon
 Ivan F. Simpson as Guizot
 William Tannen as Pierre
 Cecil Cunningham as Governor's Wife
 Joe Yule as Maurice
 Ray Walker as Coco
 George Irving as Ship's Captain 
 Edwin Maxwell as Captain de Jean 
 Robert Warwick as Commissar 
 Claude King as Monsieur Dubois
 Buster Keaton as Prisoner Lulu (uncredited)

Reception
The film was included in the 1978 book, The Fifty Worst Films of All Time (and How They Got That Way), by Harry Medved, Randy Dreyfuss, and Michael Medved.

References

External links

 
 
 
 

1940 films
1940 musical films
American black-and-white films
Films directed by Robert Z. Leonard
Films directed by W. S. Van Dyke 
Films scored by Herbert Stothart
Metro-Goldwyn-Mayer films
Operetta films
Films based on operettas
American musical films
1940s English-language films
1940s American films